Sihvonen is a Finnish surname. Notable people with the surname include:

 Aleksi Sihvonen (born 1984), Finnish vocalist
 Iris Sihvonen, Finnish speedskater
 Kari Sihvonen, Finnish ice hockey player
 Olavi Sihvonen (1918–1984), Finnish skier

Finnish-language surnames